Geremia da Montagnone or Hieremias Paduanus (died 1320/1321) was a judge and author active in Padua at the beginning of the 14th century. Little is known about his life and career, but he was apparently involved with the "proto-humanist" literary circle of Lovato Lovati at Padua. His writings include a florilegium entitled “Compendium moralium notabilium” which was published at Venice in 1505 under the title “Epytoma sapientie”.

References 

 Berthold Ullmann, "Hieremias de Montagnone and his citations from Catullus," in Studies in the Italian Renaissance, Storia e letteratura: raccolta di studi e testi 51 (1973), pp. 79–112.
 Gabriella Milan, «GEREMIA da Montagnone», in Dizionario Biografico degli Italiani, Volume 53, Roma, Istituto dell'Enciclopedia Italiana, 2000.
 C. Nighman (ed.), "The Compendium moralium notabilium Project" (2013- ): http://web.wlu.ca/history/cnighman/CMN/index.html

Year of birth missing
Year of death missing
14th-century Italian jurists
Italian male writers
Writers from Padua